Umberto Caligaris (26 July 1901 – 19 October 1940) was an Italian international footballer who played, normally at left-back, for A.S. Casale and Juventus, before ending his career with Brescia. With Juventus he won an Italian record of five consecutive Serie A League titles between 1930 and 1935. He also managed to have a successful career with the Italy national team, notably winning a bronze medal at the 1928 Summer Olympic Games; he was also a member of the Italian side that won the 1934 FIFA World Cup. His 59 caps for Italy stood as a record for many years. Following his retirement he worked as a manager, coaching his former clubs Brescia and Juventus.

Career
Born in Casale Monferrato (Piedmont), Caligaris spent the first nine years of his career with the local team, A.S. Casale. He made his debut for them on 12 October 1919 in a match against local rivals Valenzana Calcio which Casale won 3–1. Casale was then in the Italian First division (the predecessor to Serie A) and had won the championship in 1914. However they were never to repeat that success and although during Caligaris's career with the club they twice qualified for the inter-regional semi-final of North Italy, they were unable to get further.

The Italy national team, however, did provide scope for his talents. He received his first cap on 15 January 1922 against a strong Austria side, in Milan; he was selected in place of  Virginio Rosetta as right-back flanking the great Genoese left-back Renzo De Vecchi ("Son of God" to the fans), who had been playing for Italy since 1910. From then until De Vecchi's retirement from international football in March 1925, Rosetta and Caligaris were in competition for the right-back position. He played for Italy in the 1924 Olympics, the match against Spain being the first in which he played alongside Rosetta, also winning the Central European International Cup with Italy between 1927 and 1930.

After winning a bronze medal at the 1928 Summer Olympics, Caligaris left Casale to join Rosetta at Juventus, making his Serie A debut with the club on 6 October 1929, in a 3–2 home victory over Napoli. Here the two full-backs, backed by Italian international goalkeeper Gianpiero Combi, formed a formidable defensive combination. Juventus won five scudetti in a row between 1930 and 1935.

Caligaris served as Italy's captain between 1931 and 1934. His final game for Italy on 11 February 1934 was, like his first, against Austria. (Although a member of the Italian squad, he did not play in any of the 1934 World Cup matches, as Italy went on to win the tournament on home soil.) His record of 59 caps for Italy was only surpassed in 1971 by Giacinto Facchetti.

Caligaris coached Juventus from 1939 until his death. On 19 October 1940 in Turin, Caligaris returned to the field in a match between old Juventus stars, together with his old team mates Gianpiero Combi and Virginio Rosetta, but after a few minutes of play he was forced to leave the field: taken to hospital, he was struck down by an aneurysm.

Legacy
During the 1970s, an annual under-21 football tournament was named in the Italian's honour. The "Caligaris" International Tournament took place  in the player's hometown of Casale Monferrato.

Style of play
A highly successful left-back, Caligaris is regarded as one of the best Italian defenders of his generation. A strong, hard-tackling, and tenacious player, he was known for his pace, work-rate, stamina, and his ability in the air, which he combined with an excellent technique.

Honours

Club
Juventus
 Serie A: 1930–31, 1931–32, 1932–33, 1933–34, 1934–35

International
Italy
 FIFA World Cup: 1934
 Central European International Cup: 1927-30, 1933-35
 Central European International Cup: Runner-up: 1931–32
 Summer Olympics: Bronze 1928

References

External links
 Umberto Caligaris – International Appearances from RSSSF
 And the corresponding entries for Rosetta and De Vecchi
 The article on Umberto Caligaris from the Italian Wikipedia.
DatabaseOlympics.com profile

1901 births
1940 deaths
People from Casale Monferrato
Italian footballers
Italy international footballers
Casale F.B.C. players
Juventus F.C. players
Juventus F.C. managers
Serie A managers
FIFA World Cup-winning players
1934 FIFA World Cup players
Olympic footballers of Italy
Olympic bronze medalists for Italy
Footballers at the 1924 Summer Olympics
Footballers at the 1928 Summer Olympics
Olympic medalists in football
Medalists at the 1928 Summer Olympics
Association football defenders
Italian football managers
Deaths from aneurysm
Footballers from Piedmont
Sportspeople from the Province of Alessandria